For administrative purposes, the city of Bangalore is divided into nine zones, which are further subdivided into a total of 198 wards administered by the Bruhat Bengaluru Mahanagara Palike (BBMP). After delimination in 2020, BBMP has decided to increase the number of wards to 243. 45 new wards were added to the existing 198 wards. Headed by BBMP Commissioner Manjunath Prasad, the Delimitation Commission, will decide on further how to divide the city to 243 wards.

See also
 2010 Greater Bengaluru Municipal Corporation election
 2015 Greater Bengaluru Municipal Corporation election
 Yelahanka Ward
 List of wards in Bangalore (2010-2020)
 List of wards in Bangalore (1995-2006)
 List of wards in Bangalore (1989-1995)

References

External links
 BBMP ward information
 BBMP wards list
BBMP Wards Mapview OpenCity
www.thecurrentindia.com

Bangalore-related lists
Municipal wards of Bangalore